Kilkeedy is a parish in County Clare and part of the Roman Catholic Diocese of Killaloe. The parish is the only parish in said diocese whose boundaries are still identical compared with the medieval situation.

Current (2021) co-parish priests are Damien Nolan and Pat O'Neil.

The main church of the parish is the Church of St. Michaels in Tubber, completed in 1865.

The second church of the parish is the "Church of All Saints" in Boston. This church was also built in 1865 but it replaced an older limestone church with a thatched roof. That church was in its turn a replacement for a masshouse in the townland Kylcreen.

Early Monastic sites
There is evidence of multiple churches in the area, mostly in the names of townlands like Kells (Cealla, meaning cells or churches), Kilcornan (Church of St. Cornan) and Killeenmacoog (Church of McHugh). No traces of the churches are left or records are left of these churches.

Only two early monastic sites have survived: the one in the townland Cross and the one in the townland Kiltackey More.
Cross
The townland Cross contains the ruins of Kilkeedy Church or Church of St. Caoide (or St. Keedy). No records of this saint are known but his feast day was celebrated on 3 March. The present ruin is not the original, as it mostly 14th century. Attached to the surviving nave is a side chapel from a later date with a plaque dated 1706. An aerial photo shows a much larger circular enclosure then the present one, that dates from 1934/1935.

Kiltackey More
This townland contains the remains of the church of St. Taisce, a saint lost in history. Only a small fragment of the church is still in existence but the adjoining graveyard is in active use.

References

Parishes of the Roman Catholic Diocese of Killaloe